|}

The Naas Racecourse Business Club Novice Chase is a Grade 3 National Hunt steeplechase in Ireland. It is run at Naas Racecourse in January over a distance of about 3 miles (4,828 metres) and during its running there are 16 fences to be jumped..

The race was first run in 1992, and was awarded Grade 3 status in 1996. It was upgraded to Grade 2 in 2004 and downgraded back to Grade 3 in 2017. From 2000 to 2018 it was run as the Woodlands Park 100 Club Novice Chase.

Records
Most successful jockey (4 wins):
 Paul Carberry – Lord Who (2004), Parsons Pistol (2009), Oscar Looby (2010), Wounded Warrior (2015)

Most successful trainer (6 wins): 
 Noel Meade -  Parsons Pistol (2009), Oscar Looby (2010), Medical Card (2012), Wounded Warrior (2015), Moulin A Vent (2018), Thedevilscoachman (2023)

Winners

See also
 Horse racing in Ireland
 List of Irish National Hunt races

References

Racing Post: 
, 

National Hunt races in Ireland
Recurring sporting events established in 1992
National Hunt chases
Naas Racecourse
1992 establishments in Ireland